Duan Zhengming, also known by his posthumous name as the Emperor Baoding of Dali, was the 14th emperor of the Dali Kingdom. In 1081, the regent Gao Zhisheng forced Duan Zhengming's predecessor, Duan Shouhui, to abdicate and replaced him with Duan Zhengming. In 1094, Gao Shengtai, Gao Zhisheng's son, forced Duan Zhengming to relinquish the throne to him and renamed the Dali Kingdom to "Dazhong Kingdom". Gao Shengtai ruled briefly until his death in 1096, after which the throne was returned to the Duan family – Duan Zhengming's younger brother, Duan Zhengchun, became the new ruler and restored the kingdom's former name.

In fiction

Duan Zhengming is fictionalised as a minor character in the wuxia  Demi-Gods and Semi-Devils by Louis Cha.

Dali emperors
11th-century Chinese monarchs
Chinese Buddhist monarchs
Monarchs who abdicated